Okorukambe Constituency, until 2013 Steinhausen Constituency, is an electoral constituency in the Omaheke Region of Namibia. It had 9,066 inhabitants in 2004 and 5,818 registered voters . Its district capital is the settlement of Steinhausen. It further contains the settlements of Witvlei and Omitara.

Politics

SWAPO politician and Deputy Minister of Works and Transport Kilus Nguvauva was the councillor of this constituency from the 1998 regional election until 2015. The 2015 regional election was likewise won by a SWAPO candidate. Raphael Mokaleng gained 1,898 votes, followed by Emgardt Kandovazu of the Democratic Turnhalle Alliance (DTA) with 352 votes and Eskaline Ganes of the Rally for Democracy and Progress (RDP) with 164 votes. Lukas Mbangu of the All People's Party also ran and got 45 votes.

The SWAPO candidate also won the 2020 regional election. Rocco Nguvauva obtained 1,465 votes, followed by Laurentius Kamanda of the Landless People's Movement (LPM, a new party registered in 2018, 489 votes) and Kavehorere Murangi of the Popular Democratic Movement (PDM, the new name of the DTA) with 482 votes.

See also
 Administrative divisions of Namibia

References

Constituencies of Omaheke Region
States and territories established in 1992
1992 establishments in Namibia